Sinopoda forcipata is a species of spider in the family Sparassidae (huntsman spiders). It was described by Ferdinand Karsch in 1881.

See also
List of Sparassidae species

References

External links
Image

Sparassidae
Spiders described in 1881
Spiders of China